The 2013 Pure Michigan 400 was a NASCAR Sprint Cup Series stock car race that was held on August 18, 2013, at Michigan International Speedway in Brooklyn, Michigan. Contested over 200 laps on the  superspeedway, it was the twenty-third race of the 2013 NASCAR Sprint Cup Series season. Joey Logano of Penske Racing won the race, his first of the season. Kevin Harvick finished second while Kurt Busch, Paul Menard, and Clint Bowyer rounded out the top five.

Report

Background

Opened in 1960, the track's turns are banked at eighteen degrees, while the 3,600-foot-long front stretch, the location of the finish line, is banked at twelve degrees. The back stretch, has a five degree banking and is 2,242 feet long. Michigan International Speedway has a grandstand seating capacity of 84,000 people. Greg Biffle was the defending race winner after winning the race in 2012.

Before the race, Jimmie Johnson was leading the Drivers' Championship with 808 points, while Clint Bowyer stood in second with 733 points. Carl Edwards followed in the third with 728, twenty-one points ahead of Kevin Harvick and thirty-five ahead of Kyle Busch in fourth and fifth. Dale Earnhardt Jr., with 670, was in sixth; eleven ahead of Matt Kenseth, who was scored seventh. Eighth-placed Brad Keselowski was seven points ahead of Biffle and nine ahead of Martin Truex Jr. in ninth and tenth. In the Manufacturers' Championship, Chevrolet was leading with 156 points, twelve points ahead of Toyota. Ford was third with 111 points.

Practice and qualifying
Three practice sessions were held before the race. The first session, scheduled on August 16, 2013, was 90 minutes long. The second and third, held a day later on August 17, 2013, were each 55 minutes long.
The qualifying for the event was the final ever broadcast for Speed, when Fox NASCAR play-by-play announcer Mike Joy said the final moments of Speed Channel and Fox NFL Sunday host Curt Menefee introduced Fox Sports 1 the following day.

Results

Qualifying

Race results

Notes

  Points include 3 Chase for the Sprint Cup points for winning, 1 point for leading a lap, and 1 point for most laps led.
  Ineligible for driver's championship points.

Standings after the race

Drivers' Championship standings

Manufacturers' Championship standings

Note: Only the first twelve positions are included for the driver standings.

References

Pure Michigan 400
Pure Michigan 400
Pure Michigan 400
NASCAR races at Michigan International Speedway